Almontaser Bellah (21 February 1950 – 26 September 2020) was an Egyptian actor. He obtained his bachelor degree in theatrical arts in 1969, then got his Master degree in the same field in 1977. He participated in about 180 works, and he was known for Ehtaressi Men El-Regal Ya Mama (1975), Sharei Al Mawardi (1990) and Sawak al-utubis (1982).

References

External links
 

1950 births
2020 deaths
20th-century Egyptian male actors
Male actors from Cairo
Egyptian Christians